There have been two baronetcies created for persons with the surname Buchanan, both in the Baronetage of the United Kingdom.

The Buchanan Baronetcy, of Dunburgh in the County of Stirling, was created in the Baronetage of the United Kingdom on 14 December 1878 for the diplomat Sir Andrew Buchanan, GCB. He was British Ambassador to Russia from 1864 to 1867 and to Austria from 1871 to 1878. His eldest son, the second Baronet, died childless in 1901. He was succeeded by his younger brother, the third Baronet. His son, the fourth Baronet, was a Justice of the Peace, Deputy Lieutenant and High Sheriff for Nottinghamshire. As of 2007 the title is held by his eldest son, the fifth Baronet, who succeeded in 1984. He is Lord-Lieutenant of Nottinghamshire since 1991.

Sir George Buchanan, fourth son of the first Baronet, was also a noted diplomat.

The Buchanan Baronetcy, of Lavington in the County of Sussex, was created in the Baronetage of the United Kingdom on 6 February 1920. For more information on this creation, see the Baron Woolavington.

Buchanan baronets, of Dunburgh (1878)
Sir Andrew Buchanan, GCB, 1st Baronet (1807–1882)
Sir James Buchanan, 2nd Baronet (1840–1901)
Sir Eric Alexander Buchanan, 3rd Baronet (1848–1928)
Sir Charles James Buchanan, 4th Baronet (1899–1984)
Sir Andrew George Buchanan, 5th Baronet, KCVO (born 1937)

Buchanan baronets, of Lavington (1920)
see the Baron Woolavington

Notes

References
Kidd, Charles, Williamson, David (editors). Debrett's Peerage and Baronetage (1990 edition). New York: St Martin's Press, 1990, 

Buchanan
Extinct baronetcies in the Baronetage of the United Kingdom